The First Responder Bowl is an NCAA post-season college football bowl game played annually in the Dallas, Texas, area. The bowl was first held on January 1, 2011, and since 2014 has been contested in late December.  The bowl was held at the Cotton Bowl in Fair Park in Dallas through the 2018 game.  Since the Cotton Bowl was being used for the 2020 NHL Winter Classic and was not available, the 2019 edition of the bowl was played at Gerald J. Ford Stadium on the campus of Southern Methodist University (SMU) in nearby University Park, Texas. The stadium has since become the permanent home of the game.

Originally commissioned as the Dallas Football Classic, it has undergone name changes due to changes in sponsorship. From 2011 to 2012, it was named the TicketCity Bowl after sponsor TicketCity. It was then known as the Heart of Dallas Bowl when PlainsCapital Bank (2013) and Zaxby's  (2014–2017) were its sponsors. Since 2018, the game has been sponsored by Servpro and officially known as the Servpro First Responder Bowl.

History
The game was tentatively called the Dallas Football Classic until TicketCity, an online reseller of sports and entertainment tickets, became the first title sponsor, renaming the game as the TicketCity Bowl. This game physically replaced the Cotton Bowl Classic, which moved from its longtime eponymous home to AT&T Stadium in nearby Arlington in 2010. In the 2011 edition, the inaugural playing of the bowl, Texas Tech of the Big 12 Conference defeated Northwestern of the Big Ten Conference.

After its first two playings, the bowl was renamed as the Heart of Dallas Bowl. The 2013 edition, the first to be so named, saw Oklahoma State of the Big 12 defeat Purdue of the Big Ten. PlainsCapital Bank was the title sponsor in 2013, followed by Zaxby's as the title sponsor from 2014 to 2017.

The 2018 edition was the first to be named the First Responder Bowl, with Servpro as the title sponsor. That game was cancelled due to severe weather with 5:08 remaining in the first quarter, and is considered a no-contest for the teams involved; Boise State of the Mountain West Conference and Boston College of the Atlantic Coast Conference (ACC).

After having been played on January 1 or January 2 for its first four editions, the game moved to a late December date beginning with the 2014 season.

Stadium

The Cotton Bowl stadium opened in 1932.  Originally known as the Fair Park Bowl, it is located in Fair Park, site of the State Fair of Texas.  Due to the immense crowds that  SMU running back Doak Walker drew to the stadium during his college career in the late 1940s, the stadium became known as "The House That Doak Built."  The Cotton Bowl Classic called the stadium home from the bowl's inception in 1937 until the 2009 game, after which it moved to what is now AT&T Stadium. The stadium also served as the original home of Dallas' first, ill-fated National Football League franchise in 1952.  Later, and far more successfully, the NFL's Dallas Cowboys called the Cotton Bowl home for 11 years, from the team's formation in 1960 until 1971, when the Cowboys moved to Texas Stadium.  The American Football League's Dallas Texans likewise began play at the Cotton Bowl in 1960, but were unable to compete successfully financially with Cowboys and after only three money-losing seasons moved to Kansas City, where they became quite successful on and off the field as the Kansas City Chiefs.

The 2019 edition was held at Gerald J. Ford Stadium in University Park, Texas, to accommodate the 2020 NHL Winter Classic at the Cotton Bowl.

The First Responder Bowl continues to be at Gerald J. Ford Stadium, as of 2022.

Tie-ins
For the bowl's first four editions, the Big Ten Conference was contracted to send a team each season, with alternating appearances from the Big 12 Conference in even-numbered seasons and Conference USA (C-USA) in odd-numbered seasons. For the bowl's next six editions, C-USA was contracted to provide a team, which would face either a Big Ten or Big 12 team in an alternating manner.

For the 2013 season, the Big Ten did not have enough bowl-eligible teams, so the selection committee chose an at-large team, UNLV from the Mountain West Conference, to take their place. For the 2015 season, the Big 12 did not have enough bowl-eligible teams, so the selection committee selected the Washington Huskies from the Pac-12 Conference to take its place. For the 2016 season, the Big Ten sent four teams to CFP bowls, so the selection committee chose an at-large team, independent Army, to take its place. In 2017 and 2018, Conference USA was unable to send teams due to not enough members of their conference having bowl eligibility. In 2017, the Pac-12 sent Utah to face West Virginia from the Big 12. In 2018, the Big Ten did not have any remaining bowl eligible teams to send; the matchup, which was not played to completion, pitted Boise State of the Mountain West versus Boston College of the ACC. In 2019, Western Michigan became the first Mid-American Conference (MAC) team invited to the bowl.

In June 2019, the Big 12 renewed its rotating appearance schedule with the First Responder Bowl through the 2025 postseason. In December 2019, the Atlantic Coast Conference (ACC) announced a partial tie-in with the bowl beginning in the 2020 football season; the conference will send a team to one of three bowls (First Responder Bowl, Gasparilla Bowl, or Birmingham Bowl) annually. In May 2020, C-USA reached an agreement whereby it could send one or more teams to a pool of games, including the First Responder Bowl, which are operated by ESPN Events. As of the 2020 football season, the First Responder Bowl has the noted tie-ins with the ACC, Big 12, and C-USA; it also has the American Athletic Conference (AAC or "The American") as an alternate.

Game results
Rankings are based on the AP Poll prior to the game being played.

 The 2018 game was a no-contest; game canceled due to weather.
 The 2020 contest featured unusually low crowds due to the COVID-19 pandemic.

Source:

MVPs

Source:

Most appearances
Updated through the December 2022 edition (13 games, 26 total appearances).

Teams with multiple appearances

Teams with a single appearance
Won (11): Air Force, Army, Houston, Louisiana, Louisiana Tech, Memphis, Oklahoma State, Texas Tech, Utah, Washington, Western Kentucky

Lost (11): Illinois, Louisville, Northwestern, Penn State, Purdue, Southern Miss, UNLV, Utah State, UTSA, West Virginia, Western Michigan

No contest (2): Boise State, Boston College

Appearances by conference
Updated through the December 2022 edition (13 games, 26 total appearances).

 The 2018 game, scheduled between ACC and Mountain West teams, was a no-contest due to weather; no win or loss resulting.
 Games marked with an asterisk (*) were played in January of the following calendar year.
 Independent appearances: Army (2016)

Game records

Source:

Media coverage

ESPNU televised the first four games. Since December 2014, the game has aired on ESPN, with the exception in 2020 when the game was aired on ABC.

References

External links
 

 
College football bowls
Recurring sporting events established in 2011